Brickbottom is an industrial district located in southeast Somerville, Massachusetts, USA. Along with the nearby Inner Belt District, Brickbottom is a historically industrial zone of Somerville, with factories, warehouses, distribution centers, railroad connections, regional maintenance facilities, MBTA/Amtrak offices, retail stores and a hotel.

An elevated railroad right-of-way separates the Brickbottom area from the Inner Belt District located to the east. The two areas resemble each other in terms of use. However, Brickbottom has older dense development in a grid pattern and has a couple of small neighborhoods. Somerville is currently engaged in an ongoing community process, begun in 2011, to determine a long-term Master Plan for the Inner Belt and Brickbottom region. A draft of the plan should be available for public comment by the end of 2013.

History
Although the Inner Belt never came to fruition, the municipal government had razed entire swaths of Brickbottom during the 1950s in anticipation of it. Nonetheless, the city decided to keep on with their urban renewal campaigns in the area. The purpose of the renewal plan was to destroy the existing neighborhood grid pattern and reorganize the area to accommodate the Interstate, provide automobile circulation and parking, and establish single-use zoning. Simultaneously, though, American manufacturing began its long decline and the "Somerville Industrial Park" that came online in the late 1960s barely ever broke even. The failure of the ambitious Inner Belt project precipitated the relative decline of activity in the territory, which triggered the process of partial colonization of the site by artists and craftsmen. East Somerville station on the Green Line Extension opened in December 2022.

Later trends
The next major development in the area was in 1988 with the creation of the redevelopment of the A&P food-storage and bakery warehouse located at the corner of McGrath Highway and Fitchburg Street and establishment of the Brickbottom Artists Cooperative. A group of 85 artists purchased the warehouse and established the Brickbottom Artists Cooperative, providing affordable housing for artists. This live-work space was the first return of residential use to Brickbottom since the 1940s and soon the project became nationally recognized as the largest artist community under one roof in the U.S., with 155 units. The lofts continue to offer a living opportunity for artists, and provide the City with cultural events and exhibits that include the popular "Open Studios" every November.

In 2001, after installation of fiber optic infrastructure, a major telecommunications building was completed at 200 Inner Belt Road in the Inner Belt Industrial Park. The hope was that this would spark high-tech interest in the area; however, a drastic downturn in the economy brought the telecom movement to a halt across the region. Some of the companies that came to revitalize the area left, leaving vacant buildings once more.

References

Neighborhoods in Somerville, Massachusetts
Populated places in Middlesex County, Massachusetts